Simone Zaggia is an Italian astronomer.  He was born in 1965 and did undergraduate work at the 
University of Padua, where he also received his Ph.D. in 1996.  He has done post-doctoral work at the
European Southern Observatory and the Capodimonte Observatory, he worked at Trieste Observatory and currently (2007) works at Padua Observatory.
Zaggia's research interest include the dynamics of dwarf galaxies and globular clusters.

See also
List of Italian scientists

References

1965 births
21st-century Italian astronomers
People from the Province of Padua
Living people